TVR Parlemen (formerly  Swara Channel ) was an independently operated 24-hour channel for the Indonesian Parliament. This channel has been established to promote transparency in the process of democracy and is the local equivalent of the US based C-SPAN channel. SWARA regularly develops several live and recorded programs for creating political awareness among the people of Indonesia. This channel was established in 1999 with the financial assistance of IFES & USAID.

See also
 List of TV Stations in Indonesia

External links 
  Official web site

Television stations in Indonesia
Legislature broadcasters